The St. David's Episcopal Church at 834 Louisa Street in Rayville, Louisiana was built in 1909.  It was added to the National Register of Historic Places in 2007.

It is a one-story brick building with cast stone ornament.  Its architecture shows influence of both Gothic Revival and Craftsman styles.

It was deemed " a rare architectural landmark in a community with few examples of high style architecture."

References

Episcopal church buildings in Louisiana
Churches on the National Register of Historic Places in Louisiana
Gothic Revival church buildings in Louisiana
Churches completed in 1909
Buildings and structures in Richland Parish, Louisiana
National Register of Historic Places in Richland Parish, Louisiana